
Gmina Jawornik Polski is a rural gmina (administrative district) in Przeworsk County, Subcarpathian Voivodeship, in south-eastern Poland.

Villages
Gmina Jawornik Polski contains the villages and settlements of Hadle Kańczuckie, Hadle Szklarskie, Hucisko Jawornickie, Jawornik Polski, Jawornik Przedmieście, Manasterz, Widaczów and Zagórze.

Neighbouring gminas
Gmina Jawornik Polski is bordered by the gminas of Dubiecko, Dynów, Hyżne, Kańczuga and Markowa.

References

 Polish official population figures 2006

Jawornik Polski
Przeworsk County